Scott Cook "Jack" McCandless (May 5, 1891 – August 17, 1961) was a Major League Baseball outfielder who played for the Baltimore Terrapins of the Federal League in  and .

External links

1891 births
1961 deaths
Major League Baseball outfielders
Baltimore Terrapins players
Baseball players from Pennsylvania
Dallas Giants players
Sioux City Packers players